In sociology, structural cohesion is the conception of a useful formal definition and measure of cohesion in social groups. It is defined as the minimal number of actors in a social network that need to be removed to disconnect the group. It is thus identical to the question of the node connectivity of a given graph in discrete mathematics. The vertex-cut version of Menger's theorem also proves that the disconnection number is equivalent to a maximally sized group with a network in which every pair of persons has at least this number of separate paths between them. It is also useful to know that -cohesive graphs (or -components) are always a subgraph of a -core, although a -core is not always -cohesive. A -core is simply a subgraph in which all nodes have at least  neighbors but it need not even be connected. 

The boundaries of structural endogamy in a kinship group are a special case of structural cohesion.

Software 

Cohesive.blocking is the R program for computing structural cohesion according to the Moody-White (2003) algorithm. This wiki site provides numerous examples and a tutorial for use with R.

Examples 
Some illustrative examples are presented in the gallery below:

Perceived cohesion 
Perceived Cohesion Scale (PCS) is a six item scale that is used to measure structural cohesion in groups. In 1990, Bollen and Hoyle used the PCS and applied it to a study of large groups which were used to assess the psychometric qualities of their scale.

See also 
 Community cohesion
 Social cohesion
 Social network

References 

Social network analysis
Graph connectivity
Network analysis
Sociological terminology